The tonsils are a set of lymphoid organs facing into the aerodigestive tract, which is known as Waldeyer's tonsillar ring and consists of the adenoid tonsil, two tubal tonsils, two palatine tonsils, and the lingual tonsils. These organs play an important role in the immune system.

When used unqualified, the term most commonly refers specifically to the palatine tonsils, which are two lymphoid organs situated at either side of the back of the human throat. The palatine tonsils and the adenoid tonsil are organs consisting of lymphoepithelial tissue located near the oropharynx and nasopharynx (parts of the throat).

Structure 
Humans are born with four types of tonsils: the pharyngeal tonsil, two tubal tonsils, two palatine tonsils and the lingual tonsils.

Development
The palatine tonsils tend to reach their largest size in puberty, and they gradually undergo atrophy thereafter. However, they are largest relative to the diameter of the throat in young children. In adults, each palatine tonsil normally measures up to 2.5 cm in length, 2.0 cm in width and 1.2 cm in thickness.

The adenoid grows until the age of 5, starts to shrink at the age of 7 and becomes very small in adulthood.

Function 
The tonsils are immunocompetent organs which serve as the immune system's first line of defense against ingested or inhaled foreign pathogens, and as such frequently engorge with blood to assist in immune responses to common illnesses such as the common cold. The tonsils have on their surface specialized antigen capture cells called Microfold cell (M cells) that allow for the uptake of antigens produced by pathogens. These M cells then alert the B cells and T cells in the tonsil that a pathogen is present and an immune response is stimulated.  B cells are activated and proliferate in areas called germinal centers in the tonsil. These germinal centers are places where B memory cells are created and secretory antibody (IgA) is produced.

Clinical significance

The palatine tonsils can become enlarged (adenotonsillar hyperplasia) or inflamed (tonsillitis). The most common way to treat tonsillitis is with anti-inflammatory drugs such as ibuprofen, or if bacterial in origin, antibiotics, e.g. amoxicillin and azithromycin. Surgical removal (tonsillectomy) may be advised if the tonsils obstruct the airway or interfere with swallowing, or in patients with severe or recurrent tonsillitis. However, different mechanisms of pathogenesis for these two subtypes of tonsillar hypertrophy have been described, and may have different responses to identical therapeutic efforts. In older patients, asymmetric tonsils (also known as asymmetric tonsil hypertrophy) may be an indicator of virally infected tonsils, or tumors such as lymphoma or squamous cell carcinoma.

A tonsillolith (also known as a “tonsil stone”) is material that accumulates on the palatine tonsil. This can reach the size of a peppercorn and is white or cream in color. The main substance is mostly calcium, but it has a strong unpleasant odor because of hydrogen sulfide and methyl mercaptan and other chemicals.

Palatine tonsil enlargement can affect speech, making it hypernasal and giving it the sound of velopharyngeal incompetence (when space in the mouth is not fully separated from the nose's air space). Tonsil size may have a more significant impact on upper airway obstruction for obese children than for those of average weight.

As mucosal lymphatic tissue of the aerodigestive tract, the palatine tonsils are viewed in some classifications as belonging to both the gut-associated lymphoid tissue (GALT) and the mucosa-associated lymphoid tissue (MALT). Other viewpoints treat them (and the spleen and thymus) as large lymphatic organs contradistinguished from the smaller tissue loci of GALT and MALT.

Additional images

References

External links 

 
Human throat
Immune system
Lymphatic system
Lymphatic tissue
Lymphatics of the head and neck
Tonsil disorders